Moira Delia (born 30 October 1971 in Malta) is a Maltese television presenter and actress. She hosted the Junior Eurovision Song Contest 2014 in Marsa, Malta and was the first person to single-handedly host the contest. Previously, Delia has hosted Malta's national selection for the Eurovision Song Contest.

Filmography

See also
 List of Junior Eurovision Song Contest presenters
 Malta in the Junior Eurovision Song Contest
 Malta in the Eurovision Song Contest

References

Maltese television presenters
Maltese actresses
Living people
1971 births
Maltese women television presenters